Last Days at the Lodge is the third studio album by singer-songwriter Amos Lee, released on June 24, 2008, through Blue Note. The first single from the album, "Listen," was made available as a digital download on the iTunes Store on April 29, 2008.

Track listing
All songs written by Amos Lee.
"Listen" – 3:10
"Won't Let Me Go" – 4:17
"Baby I Want You" – 3:00
"Truth" – 3:23
"What's Been Going On" – 4:15
"Street Corner Preacher" – 3:14
"It Started to Rain" – 3:05
"Jails and Bombs" – 2:53
"Kid" – 3:11
"Ease Back" – 4:32
"Better Days" – 2:50
"Dignified Woman (iTunes exclusive bonus track)

Chart performance

Personnel
The Band
Amos Lee – vocals & guitars
Doyle Bramhall II – guitar
Spooner Oldham – keyboards
Pino Palladino – bass guitar
James Gadson – drums

Additional Musicians
Rami Jaffee – keyboards on "Listen" & "What's Been Going On"
Jamie Muhoberac – additional keyboards on "Won't Let Me Go" & "Jails & Bombs"
Larry Gold – string arrangements on "Won't Let Me Go"
Greg Leisz – pedal steel & banjo on "Baby I Want You" & "Ease Back"
Justin Stanley – keyboards & bass guitar on "Street Corner Preacher", drums on "What's Been Going On" & "Street Corner Preacher", percussion on "What's Been Going On"
Don Was – keyboards on "Kid", acoustic bass on "Ease Back"
Patrick Leonard – harmonium & B-3 organ on "Kid"
Amos Lee and Don Was – claps and stomps on "Street Corner Preacher"

References

External links
Last Days at the Lodge at Blue Note Records

2008 albums
Amos Lee albums
Blue Note Records albums
Albums produced by Don Was